Tonya Michelle Johnston (born July 17, 1973), better known by her stage name Solé, is an American rapper from Kansas City, Missouri.

Biography
Solé was born in 1973 in Kansas City, Missouri, to Phyllis Frazier and James Johnston,  Her siblings are Sean and Charles (Chuck) Johnston, Sierra and Tamika Gamble.
She is of West African, East African, Tamil (South Indian), Native American and Eastern European descent. 
She attended cosmetology school and college in the early 90’s where she studied Political Science and Psychology before securing a record deal with Dreamworks Records and Red Zone Entertainment

Musical career

Solé descended from a family of musical talent, song writers, singers and musicians. She began rapping at the age of 6 and formed a group called Divine with her best friend Shurhea Mitchell in 1986. The would perform at local talent shows and in 1990 they won a trip to the BRE (Black Radio Exclusive) in New Orleans, Louisiana, to perform at a showcase in front of record label execs and other artists. They were offered a record deal by JDK Records and flew to New York to record. Her father, who was managing them at the time, didn’t feel it was a good deal so they went back home and started college.

She once again began recording in 1997 with Tech 9 and Don Juan of Kansas City fame and traveled to LA to record.  She met Thabiso Nkhereanye who introduced her to Christopher Tricky Stewart of Red Zone Entertainment, who signed her to a production deal.  Her career took off as a hardcore female hip hop artist by attracting attention in the summer of 1999 with her appearance on J.T. Money's hit single "Who Dat," which reached number 1 on the US Rap chart, remaining there for 8 weeks (a record at the time), winning number 2 on the US R&B chart, and number 5 on the US Hot 100. Who Dat won "Rap Single of the Year" at the 1999 Billboard Music Awards as well. 

In September 1999, she released her debut album Skin Deep, which was an overall success  in the United States attaining Gold status and garnered her a nomination for "Rap Artist of the Year" at the Billboard Music Awards. She also went on to win several ASCAP Music awards that same year.

Her highly anticipated   return to music was guided by a desire to offer music that is empowering and inspiring, reflective of the path that she embarked upon when she left the industry.

In 2011 she was featured on “Naal Naachna" by UK based Bhangra artist Jassi Sidhu lead singer of British Indian bhangra band B21.

In February 2012 she featured on a song called "A New Look" by Focus.

In 2017 she was featured on "SocMed Digital Heroin" from Public Enemy 30th-anniversary album "Nothing Is Quick In The Desert". 

On September 29, 2019, Solé released her second album Encoded.

Personal life
Solé met Ginuwine in June 1999 and began dating in October 1999. The two became engaged in August 2000.  They resided in Brandywine, Maryland. They have two daughters together: Story (born March 29, 2001) and Dream Sarae Lumpkin (born November 1, 2002). Solé married Ginuwine on September 8, 2003 in Grand Cayman.

Solé has 4 daughters in total and one grand daughter. Her daughters De'jan Nicole Lee born in 1992 and Cypress Soleil Lee born in 1995 are from a previous relationship. Her granddaughter, Sage Lotus Lee was born May 17, 2020.

In 2014, Solé filed for divorce and it was made public when In November 2014 Ginuwine announced he and Solé had separated. Their divorce was finalized July 22, 2015.

On August 27, 2017, Solé married Public Enemy band member and rapper Professor Griff, taking his last name Shah and legally changing her full name to Aja Shah.

Discography

Studio albums

Singles

Solo

As featured performer

Guest appearances

References

External links
Solé's Official Website

Solé's Official Fansite
Solé interview on Youtube

1973 births
Living people
Rappers from Kansas City, Missouri
DreamWorks Records artists
African-American women rappers
African-American women singer-songwriters
American women rappers
Hardcore hip hop artists
Midwest hip hop musicians
21st-century American rappers
21st-century African-American women singers
Singer-songwriters from Missouri
21st-century women rappers